This is a timeline of Estonian history, comprising important legal and territorial changes and political events in Estonia and its predecessor states.  To read about the background to these events, see History of Estonia. See also the list of rulers of Estonia.

BC (Before Common-era)

1st century

2nd century

3rd century

4th century

5th century

6th century

7th century

8th century

9th century

10th century

11th century

12th century

13th century

14th century

15th century

16th century

17th century

18th century

19th century

20th century

21st century

See also
 Timeline of Tallinn history

References

Further reading
 
 

Estonian
Estonia history-related lists
Years in Estonia